Agada Vigadam is an Indian Tamil-language debate show that premiered on 20 June 2014. It aired Monday to Sunday at 10:30am on Raj TV. This program features the inner feelings of the participants. People share their experiences about the society in this program.

External links
 Raj TV Official Site 
  Raj TV on YouTube
 Raj Television Network

Raj TV television series
Tamil-language television shows
Tamil-language talk shows
2014 Tamil-language television series debuts
2010s Tamil-language television series